The Auburn–Georgia Tech football rivalry is an American college football rivalry between the Auburn Tigers and Georgia Tech Yellow Jackets. Auburn leads the series 47–41–4.

Series history
The first game took place on November 25, 1892, in Atlanta, Georgia. They played in the SIAA until it was defunct in 1922, before joining the Southeastern Conference. Georgia Tech left the SEC in 1963, playing as an independent until joining the Atlantic Coast Conference in 1980. Despite no longer being conference opponents, they played annually until 1987. The rivalry was renewed for a home and home series played in 2003 and 2005. There are no future games currently scheduled.

In 1904, Auburn hired Mike Donahue and Tech hired former Auburn coach John Heisman. From 1915 to 1922, the game was pivotal in deciding the SIAA champion. 

Sources: 2011 Auburn Football Media Guide

Notable games

1896: Wreck Tech Parade
Georgia Tech traveled to Auburn for the first time and lost to Auburn 45-0.  The night prior to the game, Auburn students greased the railroad tracks coming into Auburn.  As a result, the train carrying the Georgia Tech team slid past the Auburn station and traveled 5 miles halfway toward Loachapoka.  The Georgia Tech team had to walk the 5 miles back to Auburn.  Auburn commemorated this event with the Wreck Tech Pajama Parade prior to playing Georgia Tech.

1908: SIAA champion Auburn defeats Tech
Auburn beat Georgia Tech 44–0. Lew Hardage had a 108-yard kickoff return for a touchdown.

1917: Tech's championship team wins easy

The 1917 Georgia Tech Golden Tornado were the south's first national champion and for many years considered the greatest team the region ever produced. Heisman considered the 1917 team the best one he ever coached,  It finished the season with 68–7 victory over Auburn. Auburn was usually considered second best in the south; the team had lost only to a strong Davidson squad, and held undefeated Big Ten champion Ohio State led by Chic Harley to a scoreless tie the week before the Tech game. Ohio State was favored in the betting booth 4 or 5 to 1. Heisman and his players were at the game, rooting on the Tigers. Moon Ducote starred for Auburn. 

In the game with Auburn, Tech piled up 472 yards on the ground in 84 rushes, and got 145 yards through the air. Joe Guyon racked up four touchdowns. Everett Strupper had a 65-yard touchdown run that drew the following praise from the Atlanta Journal:"It was not the length of the run that featured it was the brilliance of it. After getting through the first line, Stroop was tackled squarely by two secondary men, and yet he squirmed and jerked loosed from them, only to face the safety man and another Tiger, coming at him from different angles. Without checking his speed Everett knifed the two men completely, running between them and dashing on to a touchdown."

In the second quarter Ducote broke through the line for what seemed like a sure touchdown with the help of the blocking from Pete Bonner and William Donahue. Guyon dove at him and missed, and then raced him down from behind with a showcase of tremendous speed, bringing Ducote down at the 26-yard line. The only Auburn score came when Ducote circled around end for 17 yards and lateraled to Donahue, who ran down the sideline for a 6-yard touchdown.  Auburn was considered a strong team despite the large score; Ducote and Bonner were the only players not from Georgia Tech to be selected unanimous All-Southern. Tech's Walker Carpenter and Strupper were the first two players from the Deep South ever selected All-American.

1919: Warren waddles for a TD
Auburn's Fatty Warren "waddled" for a 40-yard touchdown off a blocked punt, netting the conference championship and giving Tech its first loss to an SIAA school in five years, since Auburn won in 1914.

It was John Heisman's last game at Georgia Tech. Zelda Sayre sent All-Southern tackle Pete Bonner a telegram after the defeat of Georgia Tech, it read: "Shooting a seven, aren’t we awfully proud of the boys, give them my love—knew we could." She signed it "Zelder Sayre." One account of Bonner's play that day reads, "The Jackets were unable to gain through the Auburn line because of Pete Bonner, giant tackle, who seemed to have a knack of being just where he should have for the best interests of his team."

1920: Please omit Flowers

Auburn had a powerful eleven which beat Vanderbilt 56 to 6 to counter Tech's 44 to 0. Some Auburn fans predicted a victory over Tech and the Southern title. On November 25, 1920, Georgia Tech defeated Auburn at Grant Field by a score of 34 to 0 for a share of the SIAA title.  Buck Flowers, in his last game, scored three touchdowns, including punt returns of 82 and 65 yards and a 33-yard run from scrimmage, and also passed for a fourth touchdown.  Flowers also kicked a punt that went 65 yards in the air against Auburn.  Sportswriter Morgan Blake had this to say of Flowers' play against Auburn: "The Auburn Tiger came up with claws sharpened. As he writhed in death agony when the battle was over, he made one request, 'Please omit Flowers'".

The Atlanta Journal wrote that Flowers was "flitting like a phantom, an undulating, rippling, chromatic phantom, over the whitewashed lines". The yearbook remarked Bill Fincher "began his great work on the sand lots of Tech Hi here in Atlanta years ago and ended it up by smearing "Fatty" Warren of the Auburn Tigers all over the flats of Grant Field on Turkey Day last."

1922
The 1922 team is considered one of Auburn's greatest football teams, and they had lost only to undefeated Army. Still Tech held the Tigers without a first down in the second and third periods. Ed Sherling scored Auburn's touchdown on a 16-yard rush.

1987: Tillman, Tillman, Tillman
Trailing 10-7 with 4:01 remaining, Auburn took over on its own 9-yard line, needing a touchdown to win the game. Quarterback Jeff Burger led a 14-play drive that he capped off with a four-yard pass to Lawyer Tillman. Aundray Bruce led Auburn's defensive effort with a forced fumble, a recovered fumble, three QB sacks and three interceptions, one that he returned 45 yards for a touchdown.

2003: Grand Reopening
It would be 16 years before the Tigers and Yellow Jackets would meet again. Auburn was ranked as high as #3 in the preseason polls. After losing 23-0 at home week one to USC, they fell to #17. Georgia Tech on the other hand was also 0-1. They had lost at BYU 24-13. This game was the first in the expanded Bobby Dodd Stadium. Capacity had been lifted from 43,719 to 55,000. In front of a sold out crowd, Tech’s defense held Auburn to zero touchdowns and 226 yards of offense. Auburn QB Jason Campbell was sacked eight times. Reggie Ball was the first true freshman Quarterback ever to start an opener for Georgia Tech. In his first home start, Ball was 9-21 for 149 yards. The score was 10-3 at halftime. Late in the third quarter, Ball sealed the victory with a 26 yard touchdown pass to Mark Logan. Tech won 17-3. This was the Yellow Jackets first win against Auburn since 1978. After the game, Tech fans rushed the field and tore down the goalposts.

Game results

See also 
 List of NCAA college football rivalry games

References

College football rivalries in the United States
Auburn Tigers football
Georgia Tech Yellow Jackets football